

Padthaway Conservation Park (formerly the Padthaway National Park) is a protected area in the Australian state of South Australia located in the state's south-east in the gazetted locality of Padthaway about  south-east of the state capital of Adelaide and about  north-east of the locality's town centre.

The conservation park occupies land in section 136 in the cadastral unit of the Hundred of Parsons which is bounded by Beeama-Parsons Road to the south and by Padthaway Road to the north. The land originally gained protected area status in 1971, when section 136 was gazetted as the Padthaway National Park. In 1972, the national park was renamed as the Padthaway Conservation Park upon the proclamation of the National Parks and Wildlife Act 1972.

In 1992, vegetation within the conservation park was described as consisting of two vegetation associations, i.e. a woodland of South Australian blue gum and rough barked manna gum and a low open forest dominated by brown stringybark, and two sub-associations, i.e. an open/low open woodland of South Australian blue gum and pink gum and open woodland of slaty sheoak.

The conservation park is classified as an IUCN Category III protected area. In 1980, the conservation park was listed on the former Register of the National Estate.

See also
Protected areas of South Australia

References

External links
Official webpage
Webpage for the Padthaway Conservation Park on the Protected Planet website
Webpage for the Padthaway Conservation Park on the BirdsSA website

Conservation parks of South Australia
Protected areas established in 1971
1971 establishments in Australia
Limestone Coast
South Australian places listed on the defunct Register of the National Estate